Verónica Fernández Echegaray (born 16 June 1983), known professionally as Verónica Echegui, is a Spanish actress. Since making her feature film debut as the title character of the 2006 drama My Name Is Juani she has featured in films such as My Prison Yard, Kathmandu Lullaby, Family United, Unknown Origins and My Heart Goes Boom!.

In 2021, she debuted as a director with the short film , which won the Goya Award for Best Fictional Short Film.

Early life 
Verónica Fernández Echegaray (her real name) was born in Madrid on 16 June 1983. Her father is a lawyer and her mother a civil servant. In a 2015 interview she said she wanted to be an actress since she was eight but her parents wanted her "to study a career. My great-auntie was dying and told me I had to do what I wanted, although I must not tell my mother". 
Moving to London, she trained at the Royal Academy of Dramatic Arts, while working as a waitress and as a dog-walker.

Career 
Echegui was discovered by Spanish director Bigas Luna, who cast her in the 2006 film My Name Is Juani, for which she was nominated Goya Award for Best New Actress and won multiple awards including Milan International Film Festival Award for Best Actress

In 2009, she made herself known to British audiences in the Mighty Boosh film spin-off Bunny and the Bull. Starring alongside Boosh mainstays Noel Fielding, Simon Farnaby and Julian Barratt, she played a foul-mouthed waitress caught up in a bizarre, hallucinogenic road trip involving a kidnapped stuffed bear, jars of urine, deranged tramps and dogs. At the 59th Berlin International Film Festival, she was one of ten young European actors honoured with the Shooting Stars Award.

In 2012, Craig Mathieson wrote in the Australian entertainment paper The Age  "In Roberto Perez Toledo's romantic drama Six Points about Emma she plays a wilful and sexually confident blind woman, while for Manuel Martín Cuenca's sparsely atmospheric Half of Oscar she is a silent, recessive sibling circling her estranged brother, and in Icíar Bollaín's Kathmandu Lullaby she displays a forthright passion as a teacher trying to help abandoned children in Nepal."

In 2018, she made her American television debut appearing in the FX series Trust, playing one of J. Paul Getty's girlfriends, Luciana.

Private life
Echegui is fluent in Spanish, Italian and English. 

As of 2015, she was living with her then boyfriend of 4 years, Spanish actor Álex García in Brixton, London.

In 2013, her photo was selected for the official poster of the 23rd Festival of the Spanish Cinema (in French '23ème festival du cinéma espagnol') in Nantes, France.

Filmography

Film

Television

Accolades

References

External links 
 

1983 births
21st-century Spanish actresses
Living people
Actresses from Madrid
Spanish expatriates in England
Spanish film actresses
Spanish television actresses